Monticello d'Alba is a comune (municipality) in the Province of Cuneo in the Italian region Piedmont, located on the left bank of the Tanaro river, about  southeast of Turin and about  northeast of Cuneo.

It is home to one of the best preserved castles in Piedmont.

Twin towns — sister cities
Monticello d'Alba is twinned with:

  Sastre, Santa Fe, Argentina (1988)

References 

Cities and towns in Piedmont
Roero